Cryptocala chardinyi is a species of moth of the family Noctuidae. It is found in southern Finland, Estonia, Latvia and Lithuania, the Altai Mountains, from the Sayan Mountains to the Amur region, Turkmenistan, Mongolia and China.

The wingspan is 25–30 mm. Adults are on wing from the second half of June to the first half of August.

The larvae probably feed on Rumex species.

External links
Swedish Moths
Fauna Europaea

Noctuinae
Moths of Europe